Ralston may refer to:

Place names

United States
Ralston, California
Ralston, Iowa
Ralston, Nebraska
Ralston, Oklahoma
Ralston, Wyoming
Mount Ralston in the Sierra Nevada of California
Ralston Creek (Colorado)
Ralston Hall, Belmont, California, the country house of William Chapman Ralston

Elsewhere
Ralston, Alberta, Canada
Ralston, Renfrewshire, Scotland

People

Surname
Ralston (surname)

Given name
Ralston Bowles, American musician
Ralston Cash (born 1991), American baseball player
Ralston Crawford, American artist
Ralston Hill, American stage actor
Ralston Westlake, mayor of Columbus, Ohio, USA

Businesses
Ralston Foods, a unit of Ralcorp
Ralston Purina, a part of Nestlé Purina PetCare
Ralston Steel Car Company, early 20th-century company based in Columbus, Ohio

Educational institutions
Ralston College, a liberal arts college in Savannah, Georgia, United States
Ralston High School, Ralston, Nebraska
Ralston Valley High School, Arvada, Colorado

Other uses
Ralstonism, a minor 19th-century social movement in the United States
Rebel Ralston, fictitious character in the Marvel Shared Universe